Max Wolfley is an American politician serving as a member of the Oklahoma House of Representatives from the 95th district. Elected in November 2020, he assumed office on January 11, 2021.

Education 
Woldley earned a bachelor's degree from Oklahoma State University–Stillwater.

Career 
Prior to entering politics, Wolfley worked as a teacher, coach, and flooring contractor. He was elected to the Oklahoma House of Representatives in November 2020 and assumed office on January 11, 2021. Wolfley also serves as vice chair of the House Elections & Ethics Committee.

References 

Living people
Oklahoma State University alumni
Republican Party members of the Oklahoma House of Representatives
Year of birth missing (living people)
21st-century American politicians